The Moldy Peaches are an American indie group founded by Adam Green and Kimya Dawson. Leading proponents of the anti-folk scene, the band had been on hiatus since 2004, but in 2023 announced they would be reuniting on Twitter. The appearance of their song "Anyone Else but You" in the film Juno significantly raised their profile; Dawson and Green made a handful of reunion appearances together in December 2007.

History
Green and Dawson met at Exile on Main Street Records in Mount Kisco, New York, and began working together. Green put out a 7" Ep called "X-Ray Vision" under the name The Moldy Peaches, featuring recordings he made from 1994–96 with Dawson and various other friends, notably Jules Sheridan, a songwriter based in Scotland. Green and Dawson recorded a CDR album in 1998 under the name Moldy Peaches 2000 called FER THE KIDS before Dawson moved to Port Townsend, Washington. In early 1999 Green joined her there, and more home and live recordings transpired. The band returned to NYC as a 4 piece later in the year (including Jest Commons, guitar, and Justin Campbell, drums). They became active on the NYC anti-folk scene, playing at the SideWalk Cafe before the band broke up. Dawson and Green both recorded solo albums. The band reformed in August 2000 with Chris Barron of the Spin Doctors on lead guitar, Brian Piltin on bass guitar, and Strictly Beats (Brent Cole) on drums.  (The "2000" was dropped from their name around this time). A new 11 song album was recorded, which led to a deal with Rough Trade in the UK. They gained recognition after their initial 7" 'Who's Got the Crack" was named 'Single of the Week' in NME. Rough Trade released the album The Moldy Peaches in 2001. Released in the U.S. on September 11, 2001, it contained the song "NYC Is Like a Graveyard". The band expanded to a six-piece, with guitarists Jack Dishel and Aaron Wilkinson, bass player Steven Mertens, and drummer Strictly Beats, augmenting the original duo of Dawson and Green. They toured internationally with The Strokes with whom they shared record label and management.

Aaron Wilkinson left the band and was replaced by Toby Goodshank. Wilkinson died from an overdose in July 2003. The Strokes dedicated their album Room on Fire to his memory.

In 2003 a second album Moldy Peaches 2000 was released, a double-CD compilation of various scraps and live recordings.

After an extensive US headlining tour in the winter of 2003, the band went into hiatus in early 2004. However, the band reunited in late 2004 for a one-off show to benefit Accidental CDs, Records and Tapes, a hole-in-the-wall record store on Ave A in NYC. That store was an early supporter of the band and helped hook them up with the gig that ultimately got them their record deal. Both central members embarked on solo careers.

On December 2, 2007, Dawson and Green played an impromptu set together at Los Angeles' The Smell to end a show where Dawson was headlining. They changed the lyrics of the song "Who's Got The Crack" to "Who's Got The Blues". On December 3, 2007, the Moldy Peaches played at the Juno film premiere.

The band was booked to appear on the Conan O'Brien television show on January 14, 2008, but they canceled because of the writer's strike. Dawson has said that she is not keen to reform the band at present.  However, Dawson and Green did appear together on the NPR radio show Bryant Park Project on January 16, 2008. and appeared on television show The View on January 21, 2008.

Subsequent to the success of the Juno soundtrack, which hit No. 1 on the Billboard 200 on its third week of physical release, the song "Anyone Else but You" was released as a UK single on February 25, 2008.

On November 13, 2011, The Moldy Peaches played a short set at the Knitting Factory in New York.

Solo projects
Green released his seventh solo album and accompanying film, Aladdin, in 2016 via Fat Possum. His initial band included a 3-piece string section.

Dawson has continued to tour playing small clubs and house parties. Her album Remember That I Love You on K Records has been well received. Dawson collaborated with Aesop Rock on the album Hokey Fright under the name The Uncluded.

Dishel's former outfit Stipplicon having broken up, he formed a new band, Only Son, who have toured with Regina Spektor. Dishel also plays in Spektor's band.

Mertens has his own group SpaceCamp and plays in Green's backing band.

Cole is in the boyband Candy Boys and has performed with numerous acts including Dufus, Jeffrey Lewis, Only Son, Sandra Bernhard, and Toby Goodshank.

Goodshank plays solo shows and is also in a duo, Double Deuce, with his sister Angela.

Notable appearances
 The song "Anyone Else but You" was used in the Academy Award-nominated documentary film Murderball (film).
 The song "Anyone Else but You" was used in a mobile phone TV-ad in France during World Cup 2006, featuring French star Zinedine Zidane.
 The song "Anyone Else but You" is central to the 2007 Academy Award-winning film Juno and a version is also performed by the two main characters (Elliot Page and Michael Cera).
 A re-written version of "Anyone Else but You" was featured in a commercial for Atlantis Resorts in the Bahamas.
 The song "Jorge Regula" was used in a Pepsodent commercial in Hispanic America, without the group's permission.
 A version of the song "Jorge Regula" also appears in the 2006 indie film The Guatemalan Handshake.

Personnel
Kimya Dawson – vocals, guitars (1994–2004, 2007–2008)
Adam Green – vocals, guitars (1994–2004, 2007–2008)
Justice Campbell – drums (1999)
Jest Commons – guitars (1999)
Brent Cole – drums (2000–2004)
Chris Barron – guitars (2000–2001)
Brian Piltin – bass (2000–2001)
Jack Dishel – guitars (2001–2004)
Steven Mertens – bass (2001–2004)
Aaron Wilkinson – guitars (2001–2002; died 2003)
Toby Goodshank – guitars (2002–2004)

Timeline

Discography
After releasing their first few records themselves, The Moldy Peaches have released music internationally through Rough Trade. In the United States records were originally released under the Sanctuary Records banner but, since the demise of Sanctuary and the takeover of Rough Trade by the Beggars Group, U.S. releases are now also on Rough Trade.

 X-Ray Vision (EP) – Average Cabbage Records – 1996
 Moldy Peaches 2000: Fer the Kids/ Live 1999 (Cassette/CD) – Average Cabbage Records – 1999
"The Love Boat" - Live!!! (Cassette) – Average Cabbage Records – 1999
 The Moldy Peaches (CD-R) – Pro-Anti Records – 2000 (11-song CD, similar cover to next release, all songs included on later albums or singles).
 The Moldy Peaches (CD/LP) – Sanctuary Records/Rough Trade – 2001 (compilation from previous self-releases plus 1 re-recording of "Nothing Came Out")
 "County Fair/Rainbows" (CD single) – Sanctuary Records/Rough Trade – 2002
 Moldy Peaches 2000: Unreleased Cutz and Live Jamz 1994-2002 (CD) – Sanctuary Records/Rough Trade – 2003
 "Anyone Else but You" (single) – Rough Trade – 2008
 Origin Story: 1994–1999 (CD/LP/Cassette) – Org Music – 2022

Compilation appearances
 Music from the Film Garage Days ("Lucky Number Nine") – Festival Mushroom Records 2002
Music from the Film Murderball ("Anyone Else but You") – Commotion 2005
Music from the Motion Picture Juno ("Anyone Else but You") – Rhino Records 2007

References

External links

 www.moldypeaches.com Official site.
 MP2K The original official site (archive.org)
The Moldy Peaches Beggars Group USA page

Anti-folk groups
Musical groups established in 1994
Musical groups disestablished in 2008
Indie rock musical groups from New York (state)
Psychedelic folk groups
Rough Trade Records artists
Musical groups from Washington (state)
1994 establishments in New York (state)